Moresby Range is a national park in Far North Queensland, Australia, 1,314 km northwest of Brisbane.  It is part of the Coastal Wet Tropics Important Bird Area, identified as such by BirdLife International because of its importance for the conservation of lowland tropical rainforest birds.

The national park is located on the coast south of the mouth of the Johnstone River a few km from Innisfail in the Cassowary Coast Region.  The range reaches elevations of around 160 m above sea level. It belongs to the Wet Tropics biogregion and lies within the Johnstone River water catchment.  About 8% of the park is classed as wetlands.

The Spectacled flying fox is the only rare or threatened species to have been identified in the park. In 2010, five cassowaries which inhabit the park were tagged with GPS dataloggers with VHF transmitters to enable monitoring of their movement.

See also

 Protected areas of Queensland

References

National parks of Far North Queensland
Protected areas established in 1973
1973 establishments in Australia
Important Bird Areas of Queensland